Imre Pozsonyi (also known as Jesza Poszony, first name also as Emmerich and Emérico; 12 December 1880 – 2 October 1963) was a Hungarian football player and manager.

Career 
Pozsonyi started his career playing for Magyar ÚE and moved 1903 to MTK where he won the Hungarian Championship of Hungary. He also played for the Hungarian national team in its first match against Austria.

In 1921 he became manager of the Polish club Cracovia Kraków, with which he won the first national Polish championship in that year. In 1921 he also guided the Polish national team through its first international match, which was lost 0–1 to Hungary in Budapest in December 1921.

In December 1922 he became assistant to the English manager Jack Greenwell at FC Barcelona. After Greenwell's sacking August 1923, he took over the head coach role until October, when he was replaced by the Englishman Alf Spouncer. In July 1924 he was again head coach, but he was replaced in December by the Englishman Conyers "Ralph" Kirby, under whom the team won the Spanish Cup and the Catalan championship until the end of the season.

In April 1926 he became manager of Građanski Zagreb, today's Dinamo Zagreb, with which he won the Yugoslav championship of 1926. There he left in October, because he could not get his work permit renewed. After a couple of years with Ujpest FC in Budapest, where he became runner-up in cup and championship in 1927, he spent some time in the coaching staff of MTK.  Early Match 1930 he left for Mexico to become manager of Real Club España. He got the job there, because György Orth opted for a job in Chile instead. Pozsonyi won with the club the championship of 1930.

He was back in Budapest in 1932 on the occasion of the 30 anniversary of the first match between Hungary and Austria of which he had been a part. By then he had retired from management.

He died on 2 October 1963 in Budapest and was laid to rest at the Farkasréti Cemetery there.

Honours
MTK
 Hungarian Championship: 1904
Cracovia Kraków
Polish Championship: 1921
Građanski Zagreb
Kingdom of Yugoslavia Championship: 1926
Real Club España
Mexican Championship: 1929–30

External links
 
 
 Poszony on BDFutbol
 Jesza Poszony (1923 and 1924), FC Barcelona (per 20 August 2020)

Literature 
 Tamás Dénes, Mihály Sándor, Éva B. Bába: A magyar labdarúgás története I.: Amatorök és álamatorök (1897–1926), Campus Kiadó (Debreceni Campus Nonprofit Közhasznú Kft.), Debrecen, 2014. 
 Jonathan Wilson: Names Heard Long Ago: How the Golden Age of Hungarian Football Shaped the Modern Game, Blink Publishing (London, UK), 2019.

References

1880 births
1963 deaths
Footballers from Budapest
Hungarian footballers
Hungary international footballers
Újpest FC players
Újpest FC managers
FC Barcelona managers
HŠK Građanski Zagreb managers
Expatriate football managers in Yugoslavia
Hungarian football managers
MKS Cracovia managers
La Liga managers
Expatriate football managers in Poland
Hungarian expatriate sportspeople in Poland
Association footballers not categorized by position
Burials at Farkasréti Cemetery
Hungarian expatriate sportspeople in Spain
Hungarian expatriate sportspeople in Yugoslavia
Hungarian expatriate sportspeople in Mexico
Expatriate football managers in Spain
Expatriate football managers in Mexico
Hungarian expatriate football managers
FC Barcelona non-playing staff